Marjorie Edith Linton (May 20, 1917 – December 6, 1994), later known by her married name Marjorie McCloskey, was a Canadian backstroke and freestyle swimmer who competed in the 1932 Summer Olympics in Los Angeles.  In the 1932 Olympics, she was eliminated in the first round of the 100-metre backstroke as well as of the 100-metre freestyle.  At the 1930 British Empire Games in Hamilton, at the age of 13, she was a member of the Canadian relay team which won the silver medal in the 4×100-yard freestyle relay.

References

External links
Marjorie Linton's profile at Sports Reference.com

 1917 births
 1994 deaths
 Swimmers from Toronto
 Canadian female backstroke swimmers
 Canadian female freestyle swimmers
 Commonwealth Games silver medallists for Canada
 Olympic swimmers of Canada
 Swimmers at the 1930 British Empire Games
 Swimmers at the 1932 Summer Olympics
 Commonwealth Games medallists in swimming
Medallists at the 1930 British Empire Games